Joshua Zeman is an American documentary film director, writer and producer. He is best known for his documentaries Cropsey, The Killing Season and Murder Mountain.

Career
Zeman's debut feature documentary, Cropsey, premiered at the Tribeca Film Festival in 2009 and was a Critics' Pick with The New York Times, The Wall Street Journal and Roger Ebert. In 2011, he directed the short film, The Best Man for the Job, starring  David Call. In 2012, he received a MacDowell Colony Fellowship and won the 2013 Djerassi Residency Award from the San Francisco Film Society. He has co-produced or produced films including The Station Agent, Mysterious Skin, Choking Man and Against the Current.

In 2016, Zeman directed a documentary television series, The Killing Season, for A&E about the case of the Long Island Serial Killer. He also directed a documentary television series, Murder Mountain, which premiered on Fusion TV and Netflix in 2018.

In 2021, he directed a documentary television series, The Sons of Sam: A Descent into Darkness, for Netflix. Most recently, he directed a documentary film, The Loneliest Whale: The Search for 52, executive produced by Leonardo DiCaprio which will be released theatrically by Bleecker Street.

Filmography

Awards and nominations

References

External links
 

Living people
American documentary film directors
American documentary film producers
Film producers from New York (state)
Year of birth missing (living people)